Malla Reddy Institute of Medical Sciences is a medical college located near Hyderabad, India. It was started in 2012 and has a capacity of 150 seats. The institute has a 350-bed private hospital. It is accredited by the Medical Council of India. Dr. Bhadra Reddy is Chairman of Malla Reddy Institute of Medical Sciences, Malla Reddy Narayana Multispeciality Hospital, Malla Reddy Hospital.

References

External links
 Official site

Medical colleges in Telangana
Universities and colleges in Hyderabad, India
2012 establishments in Andhra Pradesh